The Nive River is a river that is part of the Darling catchment within the Murray–Darling basin, is located in the south west region of Queensland, Australia.

Course and features
There the Nive flows to the south, its course followed by the Landsborough Highway, before crossing it near Nive Downs. The river flows to the west of Augathella and has its confluence with the Warrego River south of Augathella. From source to mouth, the Nive is joined by twelve minor tributaries and descends  over its  course.

The towns of Charleville, Wyandra and Cunnamulla are located on the banks of the Warrego River. Cunnamulla is the only town with a levee bank to protect it against flooding.

History
In 1845 Major Sir Thomas Mitchell was the first European to explore the Warrego River and he named its tributary, the Nive River, after the Nive, a river in south western France. When the Mitchell district was opened for settlement, the Bell and Dutton families were among the first applicants for land on the Nive River and their leases included the site of Tambo.

See also

References

Rivers of Queensland
Tributaries of the Darling River
South West Queensland